Gillian Findlay is a Canadian television journalist who has worked for the CBC and ABC. She studied history and literature at Simon Fraser University and she holds a diploma in broadcast journalism from the British Columbia Institute of Technology.

In the 90s, Findlay worked as a foreign correspondent for CBC and later ABC, in countries such as former Yugoslavia, Somalia, Russia, South Africa, and Israel. She also worked as a Middle East correpsondent for ABC.

She has been seen in such programmes as CBC News: Disclosure and The Fifth Estate, and was a guest host on CBC Radio's journalism series As It Happens.

In July 2020, Gillian Findlay responded to allegations by former CBC producer Dexter Brown that she had used the n-word in meetings in April 2019 whilst discussing the screening of a documentary about racial issues. Ms. Findlay issued a statement that she had no recollection of using the n-word, but apologized in the event she had done so.

References

External links
 CBC profile of Gillian Findlay
 Archived former profile
 Findlay on Twitter

Year of birth missing (living people)
Canadian television reporters and correspondents
Simon Fraser University alumni
British Columbia Institute of Technology alumni
Living people
Canadian women television journalists
20th-century Canadian journalists
21st-century Canadian journalists
20th-century Canadian women
Canadian Screen Award winning journalists